Mark McKenzie or Mark MacKenzie may refer to:
Mark Mackenzie (1888–1914), Scottish cricketer
Mark McKenzie (composer) (born 1957), American film score composer
Mark McKenzie (rugby union) (born 1971), Scottish rugby union player
Mark McKenzie (soccer, born 1999), American soccer player
Mark McKenzie (footballer, born 2000), Scottish football player
Mark MacKenzie, American politician
Mark McKenzie (Australian footballer), Australian rules football player for Woodville-West Torrens Football Club
Marc MacKenzie, a character in Family Affairs
Marc McKenzie (born 1985), Scottish football player